Montepío is a small village on the Gulf Coast of Mexico, within the San Andrés Tuxtla municipality, Veracruz,  1 hour away from the major tourist center of Catemaco.

Situated at the confluence of two of the smaller rivers draining Volcano San Martin Tuxtla in the Sierra de Los Tuxtlas, the village is a vacation resort for mostly Mexican visitors.

References
 Montepío Guide

Los Tuxtlas
Veracruz
Populated places in Veracruz
Gulf Coast of Mexico
Beaches of Veracruz